Guy Accoceberry (born 5 May 1967, in Vittel) is a former French rugby union footballer. He played as a scrum-half.

He played for Tyrosse RCS and for CA Bordeaux-Bègles Gironde, from 1985/86 to 2000/01, where he achieved the greatest success of his career, winning the National Championship in 1990/91.

Accoceberry had 19 caps for France, from 1994 to 1997, scoring 2 tries, 10 points in aggregate. He had two matches played at the 1995 Rugby World Cup finals, and won a Grand Slam at the Five Nations, in 1997.

External links
Guy Accoceberry International Statistics

1967 births
Living people
French rugby union players
France international rugby union players
Rugby union scrum-halves
CA Bordeaux-Bègles Gironde players
Sportspeople from Vosges (department)
Sportspeople from Landes (department)
Politicians from Nouvelle-Aquitaine
French pharmacists